Streptomyces halstedii is a bacterium species from the genus of Streptomyces which has been isolated from deeper soil layers. Streptomyces halstedii produces magnamycin B, vicenistatin deltamycin A2, deltamycin A3, bafilomycin B1 and bafilomycin C1. Streptomyces halstedii also produces complex antifungal antibiotics like oligomycins (oligomycin A, oligomycin B, oligomycin C) and the antibiotics anisomycin and sinefungin.

Further reading

See also 
 List of Streptomyces species

References

External links
Type strain of Streptomyces halstedii at BacDive -  the Bacterial Diversity Metadatabase

halstedii
Bacteria described in 1948